Melanie Späth (born 16 June 1981) is an Irish racing cyclist. She competed in the 2013 UCI women's road race in Florence.

Major results
2015
3rd Individual Pursuit, Belgian Xmas Meetings

References

External links

1981 births
Living people
Irish female cyclists
Sportspeople from Dublin (city)